Electroshock is the former terminology for electroconvulsive therapy with electric shocks to the skull.

Electroshock may also refer to:
 Electroshock (album), a 2012 album by Kate Ryan
 Electroshock (wrestler) (born 1970), Edgar Luna Pozos, a Mexican Luchador
 Electroshock weapon, a weapon used for incapacitating a person by administering electric shock

See also
 Electric Shock (disambiguation)